The Workers' and Peasants' Party (abbreviated UEK) was a political party in Liechtenstein. The party emerged from the trade union movement, as no workers had been elected in the 1949 elections. The party was founded as a delegates' assembly in 1953. It contested the February 1953 elections, it received 198 votes (6.9%) and but failed to win a seat due to the 18% electoral threshold. The party did not contest the June 1953 elections, and has not contested any since.

Election results

References

Bibliography 
 

Defunct political parties in Liechtenstein
Political parties with year of establishment missing
Political parties with year of disestablishment missing